This is a list of Novosibirsk Metro stations, excluding abandoned, projected, planned stations, and those under construction.

List of active stations

References

Novosibirsk
Novosibirsk